opened in Nankoku, Kōchi Prefecture, Japan, in 1991. Located on the site of Okō Castle and the Chōsokabe clan residence, the collection relates to the archaeology, history, and folk customs of the area.

See also

 List of Cultural Properties of Japan - paintings (Kōchi)
 List of Cultural Properties of Japan - historical materials (Kōchi)
 List of Historic Sites of Japan (Kōchi)
 Tosa Domain

References

External links
 Kōchi Prefectural Museum of History
 Kōchi Prefectural Museum of History

Museums in Kōchi Prefecture
Museums established in 1991
1991 establishments in Japan
Nankoku, Kōchi
Prefectural museums
History museums in Japan